Najib Razak is the 6th prime minister of Malaysia, the son of former prime minister Abdul Razak Hussein. One of the most controversial leaders of the 21st century, his period of rule was marked by corruption, an extravagant lifestyle, and crackdown on free speech.

On 23 August 2022, Najib began serving a 12-year sentence in Kajang Prison for his role in the 1MDB scandal.

1MDB scandal

Pahang logging scandal
On 26 October 1987, leader of the opposition, Lim Kit Siang, called for the Anti-Corruption Agency to investigate as to how Najib, who was Pahang MB, could give approval for a logging concession of 2000 acres to a resident of a low-cost housing estate. He asked ACA to investigate whether the logging concessionaire was in fact a nominee for Najib himself.

LCS scandal 
Najib has been implicated in the misappropriation of funds in the purchase of littoral combat ships (LCS). There is a perception that Najib was "the most powerful decision-maker" in the LCS procurement arrangements as he was both prime minister and finance minister at the time (April 2009). In 2022, Najib commented that the project was given to contractor Boustead Naval Shipyard Sdn Bhd because it was owned by the Armed Forces Fund Board (LTAT) and all profits of the project would thus go to the armed forces.

Speech controversy against Chinese primary school
On 19 September 1990, Tan Chai Ho, chairman of the Federal Territory MCA Joint Committee, said he would collect controversial statements made by Najib since 1987 against Chinese primary schools. When Najib chaired the opening of the 1990 Education Conference organized by the Umno Youth League on September 15, he suggested that under the new education system, Chinese and Tamil primary schools should continue, but some subjects should use the Malay language.

Murder of Altantuya
Mongolian model Altantuya Shaariibuu disappeared outside formerly a close associate of Najib, Abdul Razak Baginda's house on October 19, 2006, and was never seen again. Three weeks later, her remains were found in a forest in Selangor. In 2008, Abdul Razak was acquitted of abetment in the murder of Altantuyaa by the High Court, while Chief Inspector Azilah Hadri and Corporal Sirul Azhar Umar were found guilty in 2015 and sentenced to death. 
 
In 2007, a Mongolian witness caused a stir in court when she revealed that Altantuya had been photographed having a meal with a Malaysian government official named 'Najib'. Detective P. Balasubramaniam also linking then Najib to Altantuya in a statutory declaration (SD) on July 3, 2008. Najib has repeatedly denied knowing Altantuya or that he had any part in her death.

On 16 December 2019, former police special action unit (UTK) personnel Azilah Hadri claimed he had acted on Najib's orders in a statutory declaration (SD). Najib claimed the development to be a conspiracy aimed at putting him behind bars immediately as the offence of murder does not qualify bail. On 23 December, Inspector-General of Police Abdul Hamid Bador said police may summon Najib for questioning over the murder.

Malaysia as an Islamic State
On 17 July 2007, Najib said Malaysia is an Islamic state and not a secular one. He said:  Comments by Najib asserting the country has never been a secular state have upset many non-Muslims. His remarks drew ripostes from lawyers, opposition parties and religious leaders, who accused the government of ignoring Malaysia's history and constitution, that authorities finally ordered mainstream media to drop the subject.

LGBT rights
The government led by Najib was vocally homophobic and used sodomy laws to slander and lock up political opponent Anwar Ibrahim for almost a decade.

In two speeches given in June and July 2012 to Muslim groups, Najib described gays as a "deviant culture" that had no place in Malaysia. In December of that year, Human Rights Watch decried Najib's remarks, saying that his "actions against LGBT people are a glaring contradiction to his self-proclaimed profile as a 'global moderate' leader." Those actions include shutting down a November 2011 sexual-diversity festival and a government programme to train people to "convert gays". And during the signing of the ASEAN Human Rights Declaration at the 21st ASEAN Summit in 2012, Najib deliberately excluded LGBT rights on the premise that the country has its own moral norms and values.

Under his administration, Information, Communications and Culture Ministry put up a play titled Asmara Songsang (Deviant Love). The play characterised LGBT individuals as predatory thugs and ended with lightning striking all individuals.
 
Najib made clear in a speech in August 2015 at an international Islamic moderation seminar in Selangor, that he believed Malaysia should not support LGBT rights. Najib stated that his administration will do its best to uphold human rights but only within the confines of Islam and that Malaysia cannot defend the more "extreme aspect of human rights", such as gay, lesbian and transsexual rights. This prompted Human Rights Watch to suggest that Malaysia withdraw from the United Nations if the government was not serious about upholding human rights for all.

Quinoa diet 
On 22 February 2018, Najib said he switched to the healthier quinoa after he was introduced to it by his son. He said: His comment that quinoa was his substitute for rice has drawn criticisms from opposition politicians, who charged that he was out of touch with the masses.

Former Prime Minister Mahathir Mohamad wrote on Twitter that he only eats local rice. Another opposition leader, Lim Kit Siang, said "Quinoa which Najib eats is about 23 times more expensive than rice, eaten by 30 million Malaysians", and that the 14th general election would be "quinoa versus rice"; "a clean government versus kleptocracy; and Najib versus people of Malaysia." DAP lawmaker Lim Lip Eng claimed that Najib is out of touch with the hardship faced by Malaysians.
 
On 23 February, The Prime Minister's Office (PMO) clarified that quinoa was recommended by Najib's doctor, and he does not rely exclusively on it.

RM1.69 billion tax case 
The government through LHDN filed the suit against Najib on June 25, 2019, seeking total payment of RM1.69 billion for income tax arrears from 2011 to 2017, with interest at 5% a year from the date of judgment, as well as costs and other relief deemed fit by the court.
 
On 8 August 2019, Najib filed an application for a stay of proceedings of the IRB's suit. On 28 February 2020, the High Court dismissed Najib's application for a stay of proceedings of the IRB's suit seeking him to pay RM1.69 billion in income tax pending an appeal on the tax assessment to IRB.

On 22 July 2020, the High Court has ruled in favour of the Inland Revenue of Board (IRB) in a summary judgment by allowing it to collect tax arrears from Najib for the amount of RM1.69 billion.
 
On 6 April 2021, Najib says he has been served with a bankruptcy notice by the Inland Revenue Board. He said being a bankrupt would mean he would lose his parliamentary seat and will be ineligible to contest for party polls and national elections.

On 14 June 2021, The High Court dismissed Najib's application for a stay of execution of its order for him to pay RM1.69 billion owed to the IRB, ruling that all taxpayers are equal before the law.

COVID-19 measure violations 
On 6 May 2021, Najib was given two fines amounting to RM3,000 for failing to comply with standard operating procedures (SOPs) of the conditional movement control order (CMCO) at a chicken rice restaurant. On 11 January 2022, the police opened an investigation into an event attended by Najib over claims that there was a breach of COVID-19 SOPs.
 
On 27 February 2022, Health Minister Khairy Jamaluddin said he will review a video depicting Najib purportedly violating COVID-19 SOPs during a campaign visit in Perling, Johor. On 10 March, Health Minister Khairy Jamaluddin revealed that his ministry had issued 42 compound notices for the violation of SOPs during the campaign period for the Johor election, including five to Najib.

Dzulkefly Ahmad defamation case
On 31 December 2021, former health minister Dzulkefly Ahmad has filed a defamation suit against Najib following his allegations of nepotism and cronyism. He filed a statement of claim at Kuala Lumpur High Court, providing an August 24, 2020, Facebook post by Najib together with a Sinar Harian article dated January 28, 2019, as key evidence. Dzulkefly is seeking an injunction to prevent Najib from making further defamatory claims and a formal apology among other things from the high court and he is also claiming RM5 million in general damages.
 
On 3 February 2022, Najib has been told to file his defence by Feb 17 in a libel suit filed against him by Dzulkefly. According to a report by ''The Edge Markets'', the Kuala Lumpur High Court senior assistant registrar Nurul Izzah Hasan Basri directed Dzulkefly's lawyers during case management to file a reply to Najib's defence by March 3.

On 29 March 2022, Najib alleged the post on cronyism in his Facebook account is not referring to Dzulkefly. He said he was merely defending the Perikatan Nasional (PN) coalition in highlighting Pakatan Harapan (PH)'s hypocrisy in alleging nepotism, cronyism and political appointments with regards to posts made in government-linked companies (GLCs).

On 22 June 2022, lawyer SN Nair, who is representing Dzulkefly, said the case has been fixed for trial over four days in June 2024.

Other controversies
 In 2013 Penang state election, BN organised a series of sponsored concerts, which were financially funded by Jho Low, a Penang-born businessman who was involved with the 1Malaysia Development Berhad (1MDB). The most famous of all was Psy's concert at the Han Chiang College on 11 February, days after the Chinese New Year. Just before Psy appeared on-stage, it was the Najib's turn to give a speech. Najib proceeded by repeatedly asking the crowd "Are you ready for Psy?" and the spectators responded "Yes". However, he next asked "Are you ready for BN?", which was met by a resounding "No!" from the crowd.
 On 1 February 2016, FinanceAsia has named Najib as the worst finance minister in 2016. The magazine said that 2015 had been a challenging year for the Malaysian economy, with a "double whammy" of the 1MDB scandal and the collapse in oil prices.
 In October 2018, in the Korean drama Terius Behind Me, Najib appeared for one second in a television news footage during a scene where National Intelligence Service (NIS) deputy chief Kwon Young-shil was receiving updates from her subordinate on NIS agent Kim Bon's activities. His television footage appearance is believed to have been from the time he was taken in for questioning at the Malaysian Anti-Corruption Commission (MACC). 
 On 14 September 2020, Najib is listed on the Malaysian Anti-Corruption Commission (MACC) online database of corruption offenders convicted locally. His name at the top of the first page of the MACC Corruption Offenders Database.
 On 7 December 2021, The Court of Appeal has sternly reminded Najib that it is a court of law and not a coffee shop. The reminded after the defence requested to postpone the hearing after the defence team became casual contact to a lawyer who was tested positive of COVID-19.
 On 25 August 2022, Royal Lake Club Kuala Lumpur has removed Najib as its patron.

See also
 1Malaysia Development Berhad scandal
 Corruption in Malaysia
 Kleptocracy
 The Kleptocrats
 Murder of Shaariibuugiin Altantuyaa
 Unexplained wealth of the Marcos family

References

Political scandals in Malaysia
Controversies by person